Periarteriolar lymphoid sheaths (or periarterial lymphatic sheaths, or PALS) are a portion of the white pulp of the spleen. They are populated largely by T cells and surround central arteries within the spleen; the PALS T-cells are presented with blood borne  antigens via myeloid dendritic cells. 

In contrast, the lymphoid portions of the white pulp are dominated by B cells.

External links
 
 
 Diagram at okstate.edu
 Diagram

Lymphatic organ anatomy